Starchild was a Canadian progressive rock band that released an LP record called Children of the Stars on the Toronto based Axe Records label in 1978, followed by a single “No Control for Rock-n-Roll” " a few years later. Both records are quite rare and collectible.

The original line-up consisted of Rick Whittier (vocals), Bob Sprenger (guitars), Neil Light (bass), and Greg "Fritz" Hinz (drums). Hinz later joined Canadian rockers Helix and was replaced by Dixie Lee, formerly drummer of British rockers Lone Star, who was coming off a stint playing in Ozzy Osbourne's first solo project.

History
Starchild was formed in 1975 in Cambridge, Ontario when Bob Sprenger, Rick Whittier, and Neil Light, who played in a steady gigging band called Gaslight, decided to reform as a heavier rock band.  The name of the band came from the Starchild Trilogy written by Frederik Pohl and Jack Williamson. Most of the band members were science fiction fans, and when the band's producer Greg Hambleton (who also signed Steel River to his Tuesday Records Tuesday label) wanted something more futuristic sounding than the previous name, Thorne.  The name change to Starchild was unanimous.  After going through a few different drummers, they hired Greg "Fritz" Hinz and hit the road full-time.

The band's first recording was a two-song demo ("Party of the Toads" and "Tough Situation") produced and engineered by a young Daniel Lanois in his mother's basement in Ancaster in 1976. Lanois went on to produce U2, Peter Gabriel, and Brian Eno among others.

Children of the Stars was recorded in Toronto in the autumn of 1977 and released in early 1978. The band opened for fellow Canadian rockers Triumph, Goddo, and Moxy as well as others.

The album received moderate airplay across the country after release, mostly as promotion for the band's live appearances.  Due to the fact there were no radio friendly commercial songs released as a charted single, it did not chart. Being a very progressive rock style (influenced by other Canadian acts like Rush and Saga) in an age of disco and new wave music was detrimental as well.

Neil Light left the band for family reasons in 1979 and was replaced by Bill Mair and later Toronto native Wayne Brown. Fritz left to join Helix a few months later and was replaced by Dixie Lee.  Starchild continued to tour across Canada, and although the band never made it to Europe, their records sold better there than they did in Canada. The single “No Control for Rock-n-Roll” was covered by a band from the Netherlands in the 1980s.

In early 1982, the band went into Metalworks Studios owned and operated by Triumph's Gil Moore, and recorded a two-song demo ("Steamroller Rock", "I Need A Woman Tonight") to shop for a new record label. Their contract with Axe records was mutually ended because the label wanted the band to change their look and musical style to the new wave trend that was becoming popular due to the success of bands like The Knack.  The band however wanted no part of that and decided to go in more of a heavy metal direction, influenced by bands like Judas Priest and Iron Maiden.

Toronto-based Attic Records were interested in signing the band but road fatigue took its toll, and Starchild split up in the summer of 1982 just before its Toronto audition for Attic.  In the seven years between formation and breakup in 1982, Starchild toured across Canada constantly.

Bob Sprenger and Neil Light formed the band Thief in the Night in 1985, opening for Trooper and Platinum Blonde and others before disbanding in 1990.

Sprenger recorded two CDs with power trio Distant Thunder in the early 1990s and reunited with original Starchild bass player Neil Light to form the rock cover band Wake the Giants in 2001.  With Canadian comedian Ron Pardo (History Bites) on drums and his brother Jason on lead vocals as well as new bass player Sam Barber (who replaced Light in 2011) the band did mostly covers including material from the Children of the Stars LP but disbanded in August 2014. Sprenger is also the lead guitarist for a vocalist/keyboardist from London Ontario named Kathryn Marquis. They recorded and released a live CD called Your Kingdom Come in 2011 and recently recorded a new CD called Fire which includes a Sprenger written song called "Purest Love". It was his first recorded and published song since the Starchild days.

Lead vocalist and founding member Rick Whittier died on September 18, 2015, after a lengthy battle with chronic obstructive pulmonary disease.

Members
Vocals - Rick Whittier
Guitars - Bob Sprenger
Bass guitar - Neil Light, Bill Mair, Wayne Brown, 

Drums - Bill Coutts, Greg "Fritz" Hinz, Dixie Lee

Discography
To date, the "Starchild" discography is yet to be reissued on compact disc but is available digitally at Axe Records.

Demos
"Party of the Toads" / "Tough Situation" (1976, produced by Daniel Lanois)
"Steamroller Rock" / "I Need A Woman Tonight" / "Teaser" (1982)

Album
Children of the Stars (1978, Axe Records distributed by London Records of Canada)

Single
"No Control for Rock-N-Roll" b/w "Detroit Rocker" (1981, Tuesday Records)

References

Canadian progressive rock groups
Musical groups from the Regional Municipality of Waterloo
Musical groups established in 1975
Musical groups disestablished in 1982
1975 establishments in Ontario
1982 disestablishments in Ontario
Axe Records artists
Tuesday Records artists